Weifang–Laixi high-speed railway is a high-speed railway in China. It opened on 26 November 2020.

History
The final set of rails were installed on 9 May 2020. Testing began on 20 August.

Route
The railway splits from the Jinan–Qingdao high-speed railway east of Weifang North and continues east. It passes to the south of Changyi and to the north of Pingdu city. South of Laixi city, the line meets the Qingdao–Rongcheng intercity railway.

Stations

References

High-speed railway lines in China
Railway lines opened in 2020